Topley Landing is an unincorporated community at the outlet of the Fulton River on the western shore of Babine Lake in northwest British Columbia, Canada.

Topley Landing is located just off Highway 118. It is within the Pacific Time Zone and observes daylight saving time.

Description
The community has 83 homes, with a few full-time residents, most of the homes being seasonal dwellings for the large influx of tourists visiting in the summer months. The sockeye salmon fishery, which opens for six weeks from the beginning of August, attracts many campers and boaters to the area.

The Nat'oot'en Nation, a First Nations band government, has a community called Tachek (or Tachet) nearby.

History
Topley Landing dates back to 1822, when it was established by the Hudson's Bay Company for local natives to trade furs for other goods, and named after an early settler, William J. Topley. Catholic missionaries took up residence in 1848 and a small church was built. A post office opened in 1921, followed by a one-room school, which was stocked with five hundred books by the retired Topley who was living in Alberta.

The church was used until 1988, when much of the population moved to nearby Granisle, where two copper mines had opened, and the church became disused. Then between 1993 and 1995 the old church building was relocated and restored, a pump organ was installed, and the church was opened to visitors in the warmer months and used for weddings, memorials and special occasions.

Climate

Topley Landing Provincial Park
Topley Landing Provincial Park, was established in 1964 along the western shore of the Lake.

References

Populated places in the Regional District of Bulkley-Nechako
Unincorporated settlements in British Columbia
Populated places established in 1822
1822 establishments in the British Empire